Lethbridge (Gunnlaugson) Aerodrome  is an aerodrome located  northeast of Lethbridge, Alberta, Canada.

See also
 List of airports in the Lethbridge area

References

Registered aerodromes in Alberta
Transport in Lethbridge